Andino is a surname. Notable people with the surname include:

Alex Andino (born 1982), Honduran footballer
Erick Andino (born 1989), Honduran footballer
Kolohe Andino (born 1994), American surfer
Lauren Andino (born 1986), American artist, skateboarder, and musician
Marco Antonio Andino (1955–2015), Honduran politician and lawyer
Mariela Andino (born 1992), Dominican team handball player
Paola Andino (born 1998), American actress
Robert Andino (born 1984), Cuban-American baseball player
Roberto Andino (born 1956), Puerto Rican boxer
Tiburcio Carías Andino (1876–1969), Honduran military man